President El Hadj Omar Bongo was a fast attack craft (FAC) in service with the Gabon Navy. The vessel was constructed in France and entered service in 1978. It was later renamed General Nazaire Boulingui. The FAC was re-engined in 1985.

Description and design
President El Hadj Omar Bongo had a triple-skinned mahogany hull.

President El Hadj Omar Bongo was equipped with Racal Decca RM1226 navigational radar. The FAC mounted two twin-mounted SS12M surface-to-surface missiles and had one  gun and one DCN  gun for anti-aircraft defence. The vessel had a complement of 20 including 3 officers.

Construction and career
The ship was built by Chantiers Navals de l'Esterel in Cannes, France. The vessel was launched on 21 November 1977, and commissioned into the Gabon Navy on 7 August 1978. The ship was named after the then-ruler of Gabon, Omar Bongo. The vessel's name was later changed to General Nazaire Boulingui. In 2000 General Nazaire Boulingui was re-activated.

Citations

References 
 
 
 
 

Naval ships of Gabon
Military equipment of Gabon
1977 ships